Zdzisław Wąsik (born 3 May 1947) is a Polish linguist and semiotician, Rector Senior and Professor Ordinarius at the Philological School of Higher Education in Wrocław and Professor Senior at Adam Mickiewicz University in Poznań.

Educational career
He received his master's title in German (1971) and doctoral degree (1976) in comparative Indo-European linguistics from the University of Wrocław. Subsequently, he habilitated in general linguistics at the Adam Mickiewicz University in Poznań in 1986 and gained his scientific title of Professor of Humanistic Sciences from the President of the Republic of Poland in 1997.

Professional experience
Between 1972 and 1999, he used to work, from Teaching Assistant to Professor, at the University of Wrocław: 
 Department of General Linguistics (1972–1976, and 1981–1999)
 Interfaculty Studies of Culture (1976–1980)
 Institute of Culturology (1980–1981)

At the same time, from 1982 to 1984, he was a grantee of the Fulbright Fellowship for Senior Scholars: in the Department of Linguistics at the State University of New York in Buffalo (5 months), and the Research Center for Language and Semiotic Studies at the Indiana University in Bloomington (12 months).

Furthermore, he received stipends under the Oxford Hospitality Scheme (1987): in the Trinity College (6 weeks), and as International Research Exchange Scholar (1991): in the Brown University English Language Program, Providence, Rhode Island (1 month); Department of Linguistics and Semiotics Rice University, Houston, Texas (2 months), Department of Linguistics at the University of Southern California and the Department of Linguistics at the University of California, Los Angeles (2 months).

In 1999, he moved to the first position at the Adam Mickiewicz University in Poznań, and in 2009 at the Philological School of Higher Education in Wrocław.

Academic positions
In his first position, he served for 14 years (1984–1999) as Head of the Department of General Linguistics at the University of Wrocław and, between 2002 and 2010, as Head of the Department of Semiotics in the School of English at the Adam Mickiewicz University in Poznań.

In the second position additionally, he directed the Department of English Linguistics in the Institute of English Philology of the Pedagogical School of Higher Education in Opole (currently Opole University) (1991–1992), Department of Linguistics of the State Vocational School of Higher Education in Wałbrzych (2000–2004), Department of English of the Nicolaus Copernicus University in Toruń (2001–2006).

At the beginning of the academic year 2002/2003, he was as appointed the first Rector in the Philological School of Higher Education in Wrocław, serving in this position until 2013. Some years later, in 2009, he created there for himself the Department of Linguistic Semiotics and Communicology as an independent research entity.

Editorial activity
He was Editor of Studia Linguistica. Acta Universitatis Wratislaviensis (1984–1999), as well as President and Member of the Editorial Board of the Treaties of Language Commission (Rozprawy Komisji Językowej) in the Wrocław Scientific Society (1997–1999).

At present, he conducts three editorial series, two national – Philologica Wratislaviensia: Acta et Studia, since 2007, Philologica Wratislaviensia: Studia Iberica et Latinoamericana, since 2012, (Philological of Higher Education in Wrocław Publishing), and one international – Philologica Wratislaviensia: From Grammar to Discourse, since 2008, (Peter Lang Verlag).

Scientific accomplishments
He is the author of 7 books, above 40 collective editorials and above 100 articles, entering the scope of general and comparative Indo-European linguistics, history and methodology of science, semiotics and theory of communication, as well as phenomenology and epistemology.

His investigative works constitute a creative contribution to the following domains: 
 the typology of Indo-European syntax: a functional analysis of question exponents in Indo-European languages and a description of interrogative intonation in Polish against the comparative background;
 the epistemology of linguistics: the elaboration of an individual conception of science as a set of mutually concatenated ontological and gnoseological perspectives;
 the questions of sign and meaning in nature and culture: the conception of a typology of semiotic objects based on the characteristics of the multipolarity of the linguistic sign, 
 the historiography and methodology of linguistics: the display of the knowledge about the development of general linguistics in the history of language sciences in Poland, 
 the theoretical foundations of "external" linguistics: the elaboration of an ecological matrix for the requirements of an external description of languages, on the basis of which several works have been launched in Poland dealing with the issues of the situational description of selected minority languages,
 the theory of discourse: a sociolinguistic typology of discourses in the sciences of language and culture in accordance with the domains of human life-world as well as a proposal to distinguish an (inter)discursive competence in the everyday life of communication participants,
semiotic-existential phenomenology and psychophysiological epistemology in surrounding world of animals and life-world of humans with special reference to the issue of significance of the objects of nature and culture in the process of acquiring knowledge through cognition and learning.

His doctoral dissertation on the structural typology of interrogative utterances on the basis of contemporary Indo-European languages was acknowledged and cited in Germany and Yugoslavia.

He is best known in Poland as the author of two books on the semiotic paradigm of linguistics (Semiotyczny paradygmat językoznawstwa, 1987), systemic and ecological properties of language in interdisciplinary investigative approaches (Systemowe i ekologiczne właściwości języka w interdyscyplinarnych podejściach badawczych, 1987), and abroad, he is mostly cited as the author of Epistemological Perspectives on Linguistic Semiotics (Peter Lang 2003) and co-editor of Hard-Science Linguistics (with Victor Huse Yngve, Continuum Books 2004.

Moreover, his recent two books have been acknowledged among English philologists and semioticians far and wide, namely Lectures on the Epistemology of Semiotics (Wrocław 2014), From Grammar to Discourse: Towards a Solipsistic Paradigm of Semiotics (Poznań 2016). The evidence of an international recognition of his scholarly contribution to linguistic semiotics and the theory of discourse were the two invitations, in 2017, to deliver a Master Lecture during the 13th World Congress of Semiotics and a Plenary-Table Lecture at the 8th Latino-American Semiotic Congress in Bogotá.

Popularizing his scientific achievements, he has delivered above 150 conference papers, including above 120 at the international forum, as well as above 50 guest lectures in Belgium, Brazil, Bulgaria, China, Colombia, Cyprus, Estonia, Germany, Finland, France, Italy, Korea, Kosovo, Latvia, the Netherlands, Norway, Poland, Romania, Slovenia, Spain, Sweden, and the United States.

Honorary distinctions
In recognition of his scientific work, he has earned, apart from numerous Rector's Awards, two ministerial distinctions, namely, the Minister of Higher Education, Science and Technique Prize for outstanding achievements in his doctoral dissertation (1979), Minister of National Education Prize for outstanding achievements in his habilitation (1988).

He has been also honored by the Oxford Alumni Card, being affiliated since 2005 as Friend, and since 2010 as Associate.

In recognition of his proposal of the division of academic disciplines in relation to linguistics, he was granted the International Journal of Arts & Sciences Best Conference Paper Award at Orlando, Florida, 2009.

Moreover, in the year 2005, he was elected as Fellow of the International Communicology Institute on the recommendation of the Director Richard Leo Lanigan from the United States of America. Besides, his Department of Linguistic Semiotics and Communicology was officially certified as a Research Group Affiliate as of 1 November 2009. In turn, on 15 November 2009 he was appointed Member of the I.C.I. Bureau, and in Autumn of 2011 Director of Regional-Continental Coordinators for Europe. Recently, in 2017, he has been invited as a Member of the International Advisory Board of the Academy of Cultural Heritages in Helsinki/Athens and, in 2018 selected as the fifth “Laureate Fellow” of the International Communicology Institute for a lifetime achievement of research scholarship).

For his organizational and educational achievements, he was lately distinguished by the President of the Republic of Poland with the Silver Cross of Merit (2008) and subsequently the Golden Cross of Merit (2011).

References

Further reading
His name has been a subject of biographical records in:
 Marquis Who’s Who in the World (A Who's Who in America Publication of Reed Elsevier) starting from 1995
 The Golden Book of Polish Science 2000 – The Scientists of the Turn of the Century (Gliwice: Helion, 2001)
 Contemporary Polish Scientists (Warszawa: Ośrodek Przetwarzania Informacji, 2002)
 The Golden Book of Humanistic Sciences (Gliwice: Helion, 2004) 
 Who is Who in Poland (Verlag für Personenenzyklopädien AG, Switzerland, since 2004)
 The Golden Book of the Polish Science – The Scientists of the United Europe (Gliwice: Helion, 2006)
 The Golden Book of Humanistic Sciences (Gliwice: Helion, 2012)

Linguists from Poland
1947 births
Living people
Academic staff of Adam Mickiewicz University in Poznań
Academic staff of Nicolaus Copernicus University in Toruń
People from Lubin County
University of Wrocław alumni
Academic staff of the University of Wrocław